Ruben Bemelmans and Tim Pütz were the defending champions but chose not to defend their title.

Nicolás Barrientos and Miguel Ángel Reyes-Varela won the title after defeating Alexander Erler and Lucas Miedler 6–7(3–7), 6–3, [11–9] in the final.

Seeds

Draw

References

External links
 Main draw

Tunis Open - Doubles
2022 Doubles